Kiambaa Constituency is an electoral constituency in Kenya. It is one of twelve constituencies in Kiambu County. The constituency was established for the 1963 elections.

Members of Parliament 

{| class="wikitable"
|-
!Elections
!MP 
!Party
!Notes
|-
| 1963 || Mbiyu Koinange || KANU || 
|-
| 1969 || Mbiyu Koinange || KANU || One-party system
|-
| 1974 || Mbiyu Koinange || KANU || One-party system
|-
| 1979 || Njenga Karume || KANU || One-party system
|-
| 1983 || Njenga Karume || KANU || One-party system. 
|-
| 1988 || Njenga Karume || KANU || One-party system. 
|-
| 1992 || J. Kamau Icharia || Ford-Asili ||  
|-
| 1997 || Njenga Karume || DP ||
|-
| 2002 || Njenga Karume || KANU ||
|-
| 2007 || Stanley Munga Githunguri || KANU ||
|-
| 2013 ||  Paul Koinange || Jubilee Party |
|
| 2021 || John Njuguna Wanjiku || UDA ||
|-
|2022 Kenya general election || John Njuguna Wanjiku || UDA ||

Locations and wards

References

External links 
 https://web.archive.org/web/20110722131843/http://www.kiambaacdf.or.ke/

Constituencies in Kiambu County
Constituencies in Central Province (Kenya)
1963 establishments in Kenya
Constituencies established in 1963